Bill Baird may refer to:

 Bill Baird (activist) (born 1932), reproductive rights pioneer, founder of the Pro Choice League
 Bill Baird (American football) (born 1939), American football player
 Bill Baird (musician), American experimental musician
 Bill Baird (racing driver) (born 1949), American race car driver

See also
 Bil Baird (1904–1987), American puppeteer
 William Baird (disambiguation)